The Carmel Bach Festival (CBF) began in 1935 as a four-day series of concerts at the Sunset School Auditorium and the Carmel Mission Basilica. Over the years, it grew to a three-week series of concerts, recitals, master classes, lectures, and open rehearsals, and in 2009 the Festival was shortened to two weeks under the leadership of Music Director and Conductor Paul Goodwin.

Dene Denny and Hazel Watrous founded the Carmel Bach Festival in Carmel-by-the-Sea, California. The Festival began as a four-day festival of open rehearsals, events, and concerts conducted by Ernst Bacon and Gastone Usigli.

In 1938, Gastone Usigli was named Music Director, leading the Festival until his death in 1956. As his successor Dene Denny chose Hungarian-born conductor Sandor Salgo.

When Salgo retired in 1991, Bruno Weil was named the Music Director and Conductor of the Carmel Bach Festival. Maestro Weil concluded his tenure with the 2010 Festival. In 2010, the Bach Festival appointed Paul Goodwin as the new Artistic Director and Principal Conductor to focus on the baroque pitch, immersing audiences in dynamic programming influenced from his UK background. The 2020 Festival was canceled due to COVID-19, and it concluded Goodwin's term. In 2022, the Festival hosted three world-renowned prospective conductors; Grete Pedersen was appointed as the new Artistic Director and Principal Conductor. 

2020 saw its season voided caused by the COVID-19 pandemic. It was also voided from 1942 to 1945 due to WWII.

Notes

References

External links
Carmel Bach Festival Tape Collection (ARS.0025), Stanford Archive of Recorded Sound
Teaching Music at Stanford, 1949–1974, Directing the Carmel Bach Festival and the Marin Symphony, 1956–1991. Sandor Salgo oral history transcript. Introduction by Robert P. Commanday. Interviews conducted by Caroline C. Crawford in 1994–1996. Regional Oral History Office, The Bancroft Library, University of California, Berkeley, 1999. Full text available online.

Classical music festivals in the United States
Bach festivals
Carmel-by-the-Sea, California
Events in the Monterey Bay Area
Festivals in the Monterey Bay Area
Music festivals in California
Tourist attractions in Monterey County, California
Music festivals established in 1935
1935 establishments in California